Charles Egan (born 14 August 1959) is a former Australian international football player of Scottish heritage.

He played in Scotland early in his career but moved to Australia to play for Frankston City in the Victorian State League. In 1981 Charlie Egan won the Victorian Rothmans Medal for being the Victorian State League Soccer Player of the Year. He scored 25 votes while playing for Frankston City that year, 2 ahead of Nelson from Sunshine.

He transferred to South Melbourne Hellas in 1982 where he made a household name for himself throughout Australia. Egan and his striking counterpart Doug Brown became a fiery force in the NSL for Hellas. 
He transferred to Brunswick Juventus later on. He played 19 matches for Australia and scored 5 goals.

Coaching career
In 2004, he was appointed coach of Altona East Phoenix in the Victorian State League Division 1, where he unsuccessfully guided them to 6th position. He took the coaching position at Altona City SC in 2005 and promoted the team into the Victorian State League Division 2 N/W. In 2006, he coached the team to 3rd position, narrowly missing out on a play-off final for promotion into Victorian State League Division 1.

References

External links

1959 births
Living people
People from Kilsyth
Scottish expatriate footballers
Australian soccer players
Australia international soccer players
Australia B international soccer players
National Soccer League (Australia) players
Brunswick Juventus players
South Melbourne FC players
Association football commentators
Kirkintilloch Rob Roy F.C. players
Berwick Rangers F.C. players
Albion Rovers F.C. players
Scottish Football League players
Scottish footballers
Scottish emigrants to Australia
Association football forwards
Footballers from North Lanarkshire